Zsolt Lázár (born 7 November 1985) is a Hungarian football player who currently plays for Budapesti VSC and also for futsal team Maglódi TC.

References

HLSZ

1985 births
Living people
Hungarians in Vojvodina
Hungarian footballers
Association football midfielders
Budapest Honvéd FC players
Vác FC players
FC Tatabánya players
Ceglédi VSE footballers
Dunaújváros PASE players
Dunaharaszti MTK players
Kisvárda FC players
Győri ETO FC players
BFC Siófok players
Monori SE players
Budapesti VSC footballers
Nemzeti Bajnokság I players
Nemzeti Bajnokság II players